Jung Woo-sung (born April 22, 1973) is a South Korean actor and the first Korean UNHCR Goodwill Ambassador.

Jung started his career as a fashion model, rising to stardom and teenage cult status with the gangster film Beat (1997), for which he won Best New Actor at the 17th Korean Association of Film Critics Awards.

Jung is also widely popular in other Asian countries, notably in Japan. He is a versatile actor known for playing leading roles in a wide spectrum of genres including high-grossing box office hits: Steel Rain (2017), The King (2017), Asura: The City of Madness (2016), The Divine Move (2014), Cold Eyes (2013); martial arts film: Reign of Assassins (2010), fantasy: The Restless (2006); dramas: Don't Forget Me (2016), City of the Rising Sun (1998), erotic thriller Scarlet Innocence (2014); romantic films: A Good Rain Knows (2009), Daisy (2006), A Moment to Remember (2004) and historical epic Musa (2001). His critically acclaimed film Innocent Witness (2019) won him Best Actor at the 40th Blue Dragon Film Awards and the Daesang (Grand Prize) for Film at the 55th Baeksang Arts Awards.

He is also an accomplished television actor. For his first major TV drama part in Asphalt Man (1995) he won Best New Actor at SBS Drama Awards and at the 32nd Baeksang Arts Awards (TV). His other prominent roles were in high-budget espionage TV series Athena: Goddess of War (2010) and the romantic drama Padam Padam (2011).

Early life 
Jung grew up in Sadang-dong, then one of the poorest towns in Seoul. He gave up studying, dropping out of high school after one year, to work and thus support the family budget. He never hid this fact or regretted doing so. He was tall in elementary school, his height causing him to constantly hunch. When trying to break into the film industry, he was told he was too tall to become an actor, so he first worked as a model.

Career

Film 
Jung Woo-sung made his film debut with a leading role in 1994's The Fox with Nine Tails, one of the first Korean fantasy movies and the first to use computer-generated imagery. He debuted together with actress Ko So-young, who later co-starred with him twice including in his breakthrough 1997 film Beat.
Directed by Kim Sung-su, Beat is a story of a high school student forced into gang life. The movie brought Jung widespread fame and started his rise to Korea's  A-list actor and one of the most sought-after commercial models.

In 1999, he starred in director City of the Rising Sun, playing an unsuccessful boxer who forms a friendship with an unlucky swindler. His co-lead in the movie, actor Lee Jung-jae, became his lifelong friend.

Jung later played a naval lieutenant in Phantom: The Submarine and a marathoner in Love.

2001's Musa marked his third collaboration with director Kim Sung-su. In the epic blockbuster, Jung played opposite Chinese star Zhang Ziyi and received wide exposure abroad as well as in Korea. After spending time in 2002 directing a series of music videos and appearing in a large number of commercials, Jung took on the eccentric lead role in Mutt Boy, the fifth film by director Kwak Kyung-taek.

Jung's next roles were in highly romantic roles that used his established screen image. In the box office hit A Moment to Remember he played an architect whose wife (played by Son Ye-jin) is diagnosed with early-onset Alzheimer's disease and in the Netherlands-set Daisy, he played a hired assassin who falls in love with a street artist played by Jun Ji-hyun. He portrayed a happily committed fireman in Sad Movie, and played a demon hunter seeking for lost love in The Restless.

Kim Jee-woon's "kimchi western" The Good, the Bad, the Weird inspired by Sergio Leone's work, would become one of Jung's most iconic roles. He used his physicality to great effect as the Clint Eastwood counterpart in The Good, the Bad and the Ugly. The film was screened out of competition at the 2008 Cannes Film Festival which also marked its world premiere. Jung attended the festival together with his co-stars. He won Best Supporting Actor at the 3rd Asian Film Awards and Outstanding Achievement in Acting at the 2008 Hawaii International Film Festival for his performance. Shortly afterwards, Jung worked again with Kim Jee-woon on a short film for W Korea.

Jung then starred alongside Chinese actress Gao Yuanyuan in Hur Jin-ho's romance film A Season of Good Rain, and Su Chao-pin's martial arts film Reign of Assassins with Michelle Yeoh.

In 2011, Jung was cast in the English-language 3D remake of John Woo's The Killer. The film was to be shot in Los Angeles, and reunite him with A Moment to Remember director John H. Lee and Reign of Assassins director John Woo acting also as producer. The project has been put on hold while John Woo works on another film. The project has yet to take off, however.Jung drew praise in his first villain role in Cold Eyes, an action thriller that became a box office hit in 2013. He portrayed the ruthless head of a criminal organization specializing in bank robbery, eluding the detectives chasing him with uncanny dexterity.
Jung next played a baduk player seeking revenge in The Divine Move, followed by an adulterous university professor gradually losing his eyesight in Scarlet Innocence. Scarlet Innocence had its world premiere at the 2014 Toronto International Film Festival, meeting with positive reviews from critics. He then took a leading role in the melodrama indie feature Don't Forget Me, also known as Remember You, a remake of the 2010 short film Remember O Goddess, both directed by Lee Yoon-jung. Jung had also co-produced this movie, explaining that he wanted to protect the director's original ideas that other producers wanted to modify.

In 2016, he starred in the noir crime thriller Asura: The City of Madness, his fourth collaboration with director Kim Sung-su. Jung played a crooked detective who attempts to save his terminally ill wife while arresting a corrupt town mayor. Asura premiered globally at the 41st Toronto Film Festival in September, 2016, where it was shown in the Special Presentations section. The actor's second movie shot in 2016 and released in 2017 was Han Jae-rim's political drama The King, whose plot revolves around a senior prosecutor being manipulated by an overambitious younger colleague connected to the mafia.

In 2017, Jung stars in Steel Rain, playing a former agent from North Korea's intelligence bureau. 
In 2018 he played an officer of the elite police unit in the science fiction action thriller Illang: The Wolf Brigade. The film, based on the Japanese anime Jin-Roh: The Wolf Brigade, was his second collaboration with director Kim Jee-woon.

In 2019, he is set to star in drama film Innocent Witness as a lawyer. His performance earned him the Grand Prize in film at the Baeksang Arts Awards. 
The same year he starred in the thriller Beasts that Cling to the Straw.

In 2020, Jung starred in the sequel of Steel Rain, titled Steel Rain 2: Summit. Jung starred alongside Lee Jung-jae in Lee's directorial debut, spy action film Hunt which premiered at 2022 Cannes Film Festival.

Television 
In 1995 Jung appeared in his first major television role in SBS drama series Asphalt Man, playing an aspiring race driver who leaves to United States to realize his dream. The part not only expanded his popularity but also brought him critical acclaim with Best New Actor award at 32nd Baeksang Arts Awards  and SBS Drama Awards.

In 2010 Jung returned to the small screen after 15 years' absence in the big-budget spy series Athena: Goddess of War, playing an NTS (National Anti-Terror Service) agent. Athena was a spin-off to the 2009 highly successful KBS2 drama IRIS. The aired in SBS channel, and its pilot episodes gathered 22.8% of the audience share. Jung and another actor were injured during filming in January 2011, causing a week's postponement of one of Athena's episodes. The series was also edited into a two-hour movie version, and released in 2011 as Athena: The Movie.

He made his Japanese drama debut with a guest appearance in episodes 6 and 7 of Good Life ~Arigatou, Papa. Sayonara~.

Jung followed that with another TV series Padam Padam which marked the establishment of new cable broadcasting station JTBC. Jung said he "decided on this drama because (he) was drawn to the way Noh Hee-kyung writes 'family drama.' Whether mother-son or father-son, the love and pain experienced by families is something (he)'d like to try portraying in a realistic way." He played a man who has recently been released from jail after serving a 16-year sentence for a crime he didn't commit. The series premiered on December 5, 2011.

In December 2020, he replaced Bae Seung-woo for SBS television series Delayed Justice as leading role. Jung served as an executive producer for Netflix series The Silent Sea in 2021. and in 2022 he will star remake of Japanese drama Say Me to Love Me

Directorial work 
In 2000 Jung had started to try his hand at directing. His first works were music videos for one of the top South Korean pop music group G.o.d. In 2012, he directed and starred in the promotional commercial for cable channel XTM. And a year later, Jung was among four celebrities who directed a short film using smartphone Samsung Galaxy S4 with the theme "Meet a Life Companion." His short Love explored the feelings of first love, and recorded 1.8 million views on YouTube. He then directed another short film for Samsung Galaxy S4, this time for the project "Story of Me and S4." In Jung's short Beginning of a Dream, Choi Jin-hyuk starred as an ordinary office worker who dreams of leaving his mundane existence and entering a world of fantasy; he is approached by a blue fish, rides a sports car at supersonic speed, sees a boy floating past holding a balloon, hangs out with a hippie band in their van, and meets himself as a young boy at a bus stop.

In 2014, Jung along with actors Francis Ng and Chang Chen, directed three short films for Three Charmed Lives, an omnibus commissioned by the Hong Kong International Film Festival. Critics praised Jung's short The Killer Behind the Old Man as the strongest and most stylish entry. In it, a son hires an ultra-methodical hitman (played by Andy Choi) to assassinate his own father, but the killer however finds himself transfixed by the man's slow-moving and ordered life, and thus hesitates to carry through with his mission.
Jung was invited to present The Killer Behind the Old Man at the 9th London Korean Film Festival in November 2014.

His feature directorial debut A Man of Reason, starring himself, Kim Nam-gil, Park Sung-woong, and Kim Jun-han was invited to the Special Presentations section at 2022 Toronto International Film Festival where it had its world premiere in September 2022.

UNHCR engagement 
In May 2014, UNHCR Korea appointed Jung Woo-sung as its first celebrity supporter. He was officially nominated UNHCR National Goodwill Ambassador on June 17, 2015. He went on his first UNHCR mission to Nepal in 2014. He then donated  to help victims of the April 25th earthquake.

In 2015 he visited South Sudan and in the beginning of March 2016 he met with Syrian refugees in Lebanon. In June 2017 he went to Kurdistan Region of Iraq and visited Qushtapa camp for Syrian refugees and Hasansham U3 camp housing mainly Iraqis displaced from Mosul region.

Talent management firms 
In October 2012 Jung left Taurus Films, his agent since 2009, and established new talent agency Red Brick House appointing his manager of 10 years as CEO.
In May 2016, Jung and actor Lee Jung-jae co-founded and became CEOs of the talent management agency, Artist Company. Apart from the owners, the company represents other artists, viz. Lee Si-a, Go Ara, Ha Jung-woo, Esom, Nam Ji-hyun and Yum Jung-ah.

Film festival jury member 
Jung has attended various international film festivals, not only as an actor or director, but has served on the following festivals' juries:
 2012: 17th Busan International Film Festival, South Korea 
 2013: 14th Jeonju International Film Festival, South Korea  
 2014: 20th Gwangju Biennale, South Korea 
 2015: SSFF & Asia (Short Shorts Film Festival & Asia), Japan
 2016: International Film Festival and Awards, Macao

Personal life 
He is best friends with fellow actor Lee Jung-jae, whom he met while filming City of the Rising Sun. They are co-owners and co-investors of several businesses, including management agency Artist Company.

The actor is notoriously private about his romantic involvements. The only one that he publicly acknowledged so far was his short-lived relationship with Athena co-star Lee Ji-ah. After they were photographed on a date in Paris, Jung confirmed in March 2011 they were dating. But after Lee's married and divorced past with top Korean singer-songwriter Seo Taiji became exposed to the public the following month, the Korean press reported in June that Jung and Lee had broken up. Despite this and contrary to some other South Korean mega stars Jung's life remains untouched by any scandals and he is often praised by fellow filmmakers for his cooperativeness and willingness to help junior colleagues on the set. He is known for picking up the tab when eating with his co-workers or ordering meals for the entire crew.

Philanthropy 
On March 8, 2022, Jung donated  million won to the Hope Bridge Disaster Relief Association along with Lee Jung-jae to help the victims of the massive wildfire that started in Uljin, Gyeongbuk and has spread to Samcheok, Gangwon.

On August 3, 2022, Hope Bridge Disaster Relief Association announced that Jung along with Lee Jung-jae joined the Hope Bridge Honors Club, a group of major donors with more than  million donations.

Filmography

Film

Television series

Television shows

As director

As producer

As executive producer

Awards and nominations

State honors

Listicles

Notes

References

External links 

 

South Korean male film actors
South Korean male television actors
South Korean male models
1973 births
Living people
IHQ (company) artists
Male actors from Seoul
20th-century South Korean male actors
21st-century South Korean male actors
United Nations High Commissioner for Refugees Goodwill Ambassadors
Best Supporting Actor Asian Film Award winners
Grand Prize Paeksang Arts Award (Film) winners
Best New Actor Paeksang Arts Award (television) winners